Lüssow is a village and a former municipality in the Vorpommern-Greifswald district, in Mecklenburg-Vorpommern, Germany. Since 1 January 2010, it is part of the town Gützkow.

Notable residents 

 Fritz Sdunek (1947–2014), boxing trainer

Villages in Mecklenburg-Western Pomerania